Otto Friedrich Bollnow (14 March 1903 – 7 February 1991) was a German philosopher and teacher.

Biography
He was born the son of a rector in Stettin in what was then northwest Germany (now Szczecin, Poland) and went to school in the town of Anklam. After gaining his Abitur (school leaving certificate) he studied mathematics and physics at Göttingen University, where he was influenced by the philosopher Herman Nohl. Bollnow received a doctorate in physics in 1925 and successfully completed his habilitation with Georg Misch at Göttingen in 1931. He taught at Göttingen for some years without being appointed to the faculty. Bollnow was a member of the Militant League for German Culture.

In 1933 Bollnow signed the Vow of allegiance of the Professors of the German Universities and High-Schools to Adolf Hitler and the National Socialistic State.

In 1939 he moved to the University of Gießen then briefly to the University of Kiel, to the University of Mainz and finally in 1953 to a chair in contemporary philosophy, philosophical anthropology and ethics at the University of Tübingen. He taught at Tübingen until his retirement in 1970.

Bollnow developed the work of Wilhelm Dilthey on hermeneutics and was concerned with the philosophical foundations of pedagogy. He also concerned himself with the foundations of philosophy and with phenomenology and existential philosophy. Martin Heidegger charged Bollnow with "having launched [...] the starkest misinterpretation of Being and Time" ("die gröbste Mißdeutung von Sein und Zeit [...] auf die Bahn gebracht").

In 1980 he received the Lessing-Prize, a literary and cultural honour endowed by German Freemasons.

He died in Tübingen.

Works
 Die Lebensphilosophie F. H. Jacobis, Stuttgart 1933, 2nd edition, 1966
 Dilthey. Eine Einführung in seine Philosophie, Teubner, Leipzig 1936. 4th edition, Novalis, Schaffhausen 1980, 
 Das Wesen der Stimmungen, Klostermann, Frankfurt a.M. 1941, 8th ed., 1995, 
 Existenzphilosophie, Kohlhammer Verlag, Stuttgart 1943, 8th edition, 1978
 Die Ehrfurcht,  Klostermann, Frankfurt a.M., 1947, 2nd edition 1958
 Das Verstehen, Drei Aufsätze zur Theorie der Geisteswissenschaften, Kirchheim Mainz 1949
 Rilke, Kohlhammer, Stuttgart 1951, 2nd edition 1955
 Die Pädagogik der deutschen Romantik, Von Arndt bis Fröbel, Kohlhammer, Stuttgart 1952, 3rd edition 1977
 Unruhe und Geborgenheit im Weltbild neuerer Dichter. Acht Essays, Stuttgart 1955, 3rd edition 1972
 Neue Geborgenheit. Das Problem einer Überwindung des Existenzialismus. Stuttgart 1955, 4th edition 1979
 Die Lebensphilosophie, Berlin-Göttingen-Heidelberg 1958
 Wesen und Wandel der Tugenden, Frankfurt a.M., 1958
 Existenzphilosophie und Pädagogik. Versuch über unstetige Formen der Erziehung. Kohlhammer, Stuttgart 1959, 5th edition 1977
 Mensch und Raum. Kohlhammer, Stuttgart 1963, 4th edition 1980
 die macht des worts. Sprachphilosophische Überlegungen aus pädagogischer Perspektive, Neue Deutsche Schule, Essen 1964, 3rd edition 1971
 Die pädagogische Atmosphäre. Untersuchung über die gefühlsmäßigen zwischenmenschlichen Voraussetzungen der Erziehung, Quelle & Meyer, Heidelberg 1964, 4th edition 1970 
 Französischer Existentialismus, Stuttgart 1965
 die anthropologische betrachtungsweise in der pädagogik, Neue Deutsche Schule, Essen 1965, 3rd edition 1975
 Sprache und Erziehung, Stuttgart 1966, 3rd edition 1979
 Philosophie der Erkenntnis. Das Vorverständnis und die Erfahrung des Neuen, Stuttgart 1970, 2nd edition 1981
 Das Doppelgesicht der Wahrheit, Philosophie der Erkenntnis, 2nd volume, Stuttgart 1975
 Vom Geist des Übens, Freiburg i. Br, 1978
 Studien zur Hermeneutik Volume I: Zur Philosophie der Geisteswissenschaften, Alber, Freiburg / München 1982, 
 Studien zur Hermeneutik Volume II: Zur hermeneutischen Logik von Georg Misch und Hans Lipps, Alber, Freiburg / München 1983, 
 Otto Friedrich Bollnow im Gespräch',' Hrsg. von Hans-Peter Göbbeler und Hans-Ulrich Lessing. Alber, Freiburg / München 1983, 
 Zwischen Philosophie und Pädagogik, Vorträge und Aufsätze, Weitz, Aachen 1988

 References 

Sources
 Ralf Koerrenz: Otto Friedrich Bollnow, Ein pädagogisches Portrait, Beltz (UTB), Weinheim/Basel 2004, 
 Astrid Schollenberger: Grundzüge einer Philosophie der Hoffnung: Die Bedeutung der Krise im philosophischen und pädagogischen Denken von Otto Friedrich Bollnow'', Turnshare (London), 2003,

External links
Otto Friedrich Bollnow: His life and work
Otto Friedrich Bollnow: Nietzsche and Leopardi
Otto Friedrich Bollnow: Der erlebte Raum
 A biography of Bollnow

1903 births
1991 deaths
20th-century German philosophers
Continental philosophers
Hermeneutists
Phenomenologists
Militant League for German Culture members
German male writers
Officers Crosses of the Order of Merit of the Federal Republic of Germany